The Sikh Empire (1799 – 1849 CE) was established by Maharaja Ranjit Singh. Throughout its history, it fought various adversaries including the Durrani Empire of Afghanistan and the British East India Company.

Background

The Sikhs first raised their weapons against the Mughal Empire under Guru Hargobind. Shri Guru Hargobind Ji was son of the 5th Shri Guru Arjan Dev Ji who was executed by the Mughal ruler Jahangir. After his father's death, Shri Guru Hargobind Ji added the martial element to Sikhism which was until then a religion mainly focused on Spirituality. But at this point the need for self defence was felt. Hence Shri Guru Hargobind Ji started recruiting an army which he called "Risaldari", after training his men in cavalry and Sikh Martial Arts. He adopted Royal symbols like wearing "kalgidhari turban" and keeping bodyguards. Along with that he asked his followers to gift him horses and weaponry instead of anything else. So the 6th Guru at one point managed to command 700 cavalry and with this might his Risaldari fought several small scale battles in 1620s and 1630s against Shahjahan's forces and some other warlords in Poadh and Majha.  The tenth and the last Guru, Guru Gobind Singh organized Sikhs into a military sect called Khalsa (means "pure"), in 1699, against the Mughal emperor Aurangzeb. Before his death in 1708, he sent Banda Singh Bahadur to lead the Sikhs of Punjab. Banda Singh Bahadur through his outstanding leadership skills weakened the Mughal grasp over India. But he was later captured and beheaded in Delhi in 1716, during the reign of Farrukhsiyar.

Thereafter, Sikhs were divided into Misls. In 1738, Nadir Shah of Iran, attacked India , looted Delhi and Mughals were never able to recover their power in Punjab. Later, Punjab was subject to constant invasions of Ahmad Shah Durrani of Afghanistan. He was defeated every time.

Abdali tried many times to recover Lahore but ultimately had to return to Pashtun territories. After his final invasion of Punjab in 1767, he left Lahore which was when it was re-captured by the Sikhs. For more than three decades, Sikhs consolidated their power in areas of Punjab. But the decisive moment came in 1790, when Ranjit Singh of Sukerchakia misl became misldar. He started uniting misls and finally took Lahore in 1799. His coronation on 12 April 1801 marked the beginning of the Sikh Empire, which went on to conquer the whole Punjab, Kangra, parts of Kashmir and briefly, the city of Peshawar.

Battles fought by Sikh Empire

Afghan-Sikh Wars 
The Afghan-Sikh Wars were fought between the Sikh Empire and the Durrani Empire.

Battle of Attock 

The battle took place on 13 July 1813, in which Sikhs defeated the Durranis. It was the first major victory of Sikhs against the Afghan adversary.

Battle of Multan 

The Battle of Multan started in March 1818 and ended three months later on 2 June 1818. Sikhs utterly dominated Durranis and captured Multan. The Afghan governor Muzaffar Khan Sadozai was killed. As a result, the Afghan power collapsed in Punjab and the regions to the east of Indus virtually came under Sikh influence.

Battle of Shopian 

The battle took place on 3 July 1819 during the Sikh expedition to Kashmir. The domination that came from the Sikhs led to the end the five centuries old Muslim rule in Kashmir. The Afghan governor Jabbar Khan fled and Kashmir became a province of the Sikh Empire.

Battle of Nowshera 

The battle was fought on 14 March 1823 in which the Sikhs captured the city of Peshawar.

Battle of Peshawar 

The battle was fought on 6 May 1834. Under the command of Hari Singh Nalwa, Sikhs finally captured the city of Peshawar and installed a Muslim governor.

Battle of Jamrud

First Anglo-Sikh War

Battle of Mudki 

The battle was fought on 18 December 1845 during night. The British won with heavy casualties on the higher ranks.

Battle of Ferozeshah 

The battle was fought on 21–22 December 1845, in which the British forces under Sir Hugh Gough won a Pyrrhic victory over the Sikh army under Lal Singh.

Battle of Baddowal 

In this battle, a large number of Sikh soldiers crossed Satluj after being defeated at Mudki and Ferozeshah. When General Henry Smith marched to Dharmkot to relieve Ludhiana, their rear was attacked by Sikhs under Ranjodh Singh Majithia. Hence, Sikhs gave a defeat to British in the battle of Baddowal.

Battle of Aliwal 

The battle was fought on 28 January 1846, in which the company troops decisively defeated the Sikh army. It proved as the turning point in the war.

Battle of Sobraon 

The decisive Sikh Victory by the East India Company at the battle of Sobraon fought on 10 February 1846 ended the war.

Second Anglo-Sikh War

Battle of Ramnagar 

In the battle of Ramnagar fought on 22 November 1848, Sikhs under Sher Singh Attariwalla defeated the company forces under Sir Hugh Gough

Battle of Chillianwala 

In the battle on 13 January 1849, the Sikh army under Sher Singh Attariwalla defeated the British army under Sir Hugh Gough.

Siege of Multan 

The prolonged siege of Multan by the British army lasted from 19 April 1848 until 22 January 1849, when the fort was breached and Dewan Mulraj surrendered. Multan was then captured by the British.

Battle of Gujrat 

This was the last battle of the war and the Anglo-Sikh battle. Sir Hugh Gough's army decisively defeated the Sikh forces. The Sikh Empire officially ended as the young emperor, (Maharaja Dalip Singh) was kidnapped and taken to England. Punjab was annexed as a province of the British Indian Empire.

See also
 Guru Gobind Singh
 Banda Singh Bahadur
 Baghel Singh
 Massa Ranghar

References

Lists of battles
Military history of India
Battles involving the Sikhs